Ayodeji Brown (born 12 September 1988) is a Nigerian professional footballer who plays as a defender.

career
He played at the 2007 FIFA U-20 World Cup. 
Brown started his footballing career at the age of eight, when he began playing for Pepsi Football Academy. He signed his first professional contract with the club Tavriya Fc, in Ukraine.

International
Brown was a part of the Nigerian national under-20 football team, playing in the 2007 FIFA U-20 nation cup & World Cup in Canada.

References

1988 births
Living people
Nigerian footballers
Nigeria under-20 international footballers
Nigerian expatriate footballers
Nigerian expatriate sportspeople in Ukraine
Expatriate footballers in Ukraine
SC Tavriya Simferopol players
Ukrainian Premier League players
Association football defenders
Yoruba sportspeople